West Caroga Lake is located in the Town of Caroga by Caroga Lake, New York. The lake is known for excellent warm water fishing, but it also offers the only location to fish for splake in the county. The lake is connected to East Caroga Lake by a small channel.
Origin of the name, "Caroga" is derived from the once nearby Indian Village known as "Caroga".

Fishing 

Fish found within this lake include smallmouth bass, lake whitefish, atlantic salmon, white sucker, rainbow trout, rock bass, landlocked salmon, chain pickerel, brown bullhead, yellow perch, pumpkinseed sunfish, and splake. Anglers have the opportunity to fish for warm water species and trout because of the unique contour of lake. Rainbow trout have also been known to enter into West Caroga Lake through the channel from East Caroga Lake.

References 

Lakes of Fulton County, New York
Lakes of New York (state)